Bakhshish Singh Virk (born 27 July 1957) is Bhartiya Janata Party's MLA from Assandh (Haryana) constituency. He defeated the BSP's with 4000+ votes in assembly elections 2014.

In August 2017, Virk was charged with attacking media personnel.

Personal life
Virk was born to Gulab Singh Virk in Behlalpur village in Karnal district of Haryana. He did his matriculation from Govt. Senior Secondary School, Kachhwa in April 1973. He is married to Davinder Kour with whom he has a son and a daughter. He is a resident of Assandh.

See also 
 Haryana Legislative Assembly
 2014 Haryana Legislative Assembly election

References

1957 births
Living people
Bharatiya Janata Party politicians from Haryana
Haryana MLAs 2014–2019
People from Karnal district